Walter Hines Page (August 15, 1855 – December 21, 1918) was an American journalist, publisher, and diplomat. He was the United States ambassador to the United Kingdom during World War I.

Page founded the State Chronicle, a newspaper in Raleigh, North Carolina, and worked with other leaders to gain legislative approval for what is now known as North Carolina State University, which was established as a land-grant college in 1885. He worked on several newspapers, including the New York World and Evening Post. He was the editor of The Atlantic Monthly for several years and also a literary adviser to Houghton Mifflin. For more than a decade starting in 1900, he was a partner of Doubleday, Page & Company, a major book publisher in New York City.

Life and career
Page was born in Cary, North Carolina to father Allison Francis "Frank" Page and his wife, Catherine Frances Raboteau.  His father built the Page-Walker Hotel about 1868. Walter was educated at Trinity College (Duke University), then at Randolph-Macon College and Johns Hopkins University. His studies complete, he taught for a time in Louisville, Kentucky.

On November 15, 1880, Page married Willa Alice Wilson. They had a daughter and three sons including Arthur W. Page.

Page began his journalism career as a writer and then editor at the St. Joseph Gazette in Missouri.  (The St. Joseph Gazette published in that town from 1845 until June 30, 1888, when its morning position was taken over by its sister paper, the St. Joseph News-Press.) After a short time at the Gazette, in 1881 Page resigned to travel through the South, having arranged to contribute letters on southern sociological conditions to the New York World, the Springfield Republican of Massachusetts, and the Boston Post. He intended these letters to educate both the North and the South in a fuller understanding of their mutual dependence. In 1882, he joined the editorial staff of the New York World; among his major work was a series of articles on Mormonism, the result of personal investigation in Utah.

Later in 1882, Page went to Raleigh, North Carolina, where he founded the State Chronicle. Two years later, he was a founding member of the Watauga Club, along with Arthur Winslow and William Joseph Peele. Together, they petitioned the North Carolina General Assembly early in 1885 to create an institution for industrial education for "wood-work, mining, metallurgy, practical agriculture" and similar fields; establishing what is now North Carolina State University, a land-grant college, which could receive federal funds.

Page returned to New York in 1883 and for four years was on the staff of the Evening Post. From 1887 to 1895, he was manager and, after 1890, editor of The Forum, a monthly magazine. From 1895 to 1900, he was literary adviser to Houghton, Mifflin and Company, and for most of the same period editor of The Atlantic Monthly (1896–99).

From 1900 to 1913, Page was partner and vice president of Doubleday, Page & Co.; when he joined Frank Nelson Doubleday as a partner, the company's name was changed to include his. He also was editor of World's Work magazine. Doubleday, Page & Co. became one of the great book publishing companies of the 20th century. The company sometimes published under the name "Country Life Press" in Garden City, New York, where Page resided in the years prior to World War I. Among the great writers it published in its early years was Rudyard Kipling. In 1986, it was acquired by Bertelsmann AG.

Page believed that a free and open education was fundamental to democracy. In 1902, he published The Rebuilding of Old Commonwealths, which emphasized that. He felt that nothing (class, economic means, race, or religion) should be a barrier to education.

Ambassador 

In March 1913, Page was appointed United States ambassador to the United Kingdom by President Woodrow Wilson, whom Page had befriended in 1882 when Wilson was a young lawyer starting out in Atlanta. Page was one of the key figures involved in bringing the United States into World War I on the Allied side. A proud Southerner, he admired his British roots and believed that the United Kingdom was fighting a war for democracy. As ambassador to Britain, he defended British policies to Wilson and helped to shape a pro-Allied slant in the President and in the United States as a whole. One month after Page sent a message to Wilson, the U.S. Congress declared war on Germany.

Page was criticized for his unabashedly pro-British stance by those who thought his priority should be defending American interests in the face of British criticism. He and his staff had to deal with the British claim of the right to stop and search American ships, including the examination of mail pouches; the commercial blockade (1915); and the "blacklist," the names of American firms with whom the British forbade all financial and commercial dealings by their citizens (1916).

In 1918, Page became ill and resigned his post as Ambassador to the Court of St. James's. He returned to his home in Pinehurst, North Carolina, where he died. He is buried in Old Bethesda Cemetery in Aberdeen, North Carolina.

Legacy and honors
A memorial plaque in his honor was installed in Westminster Abbey in Westminster, London, UK.
The Life and Letters of Walter H. Page (1923), by Burton J. Hendrick, was awarded the Pulitzer Prize for Biography, and Hendrick's The Training of an American: The Earlier Life and Letters of Walter H. Page was awarded the Pulitzer Prize for Biography in 1929.
The Walter Hines Page School of International Relations at Johns Hopkins University, in existence from 1930 to 1953, was named after him.
Walter Hines Page Senior High School in Greensboro, North Carolina, the Walter Hines Page Research Professor of Literature chair (currently held by Ariel Dorfman) at Duke University, the Walter Hines Page Library at Randolph-Macon College in Ashland, Va., and the London chapter of the Daughters of the American Revolution were named for him.
Today, scholarships are awarded by the English-Speaking Union (ESU) in Walter Hines Page's name to teachers from the United Kingdom to study in the United States and Canada.
Page Hall at North Carolina State University was named in his honor.

Publication 
A Publisher's Confession (1905)

References

External links
 

Ambassadors of the United States to the United Kingdom
American male journalists
Journalists from North Carolina
Duke University Trinity College of Arts and Sciences alumni
1855 births
1918 deaths
The Atlantic (magazine) people
People from Cary, North Carolina
20th-century American diplomats